The 1982 Kansas State Wildcats football team represented Kansas State University in the 1982 NCAA Division I-A football season.  The team's head football coach was Jim Dickey.  The Wildcats played their home games in KSU Stadium.

The Wildcats finished the 1982 season with a record of 6–5–1, and a 3–3–1 record in Big Eight Conference play.  It was the program's first winning season since 1970.  During the season Kansas State played its first night game in KSU Stadium, a 36–7 win over Kansas.  Temporary lights were erected for the game by TBS, which televised the contest.  A then-record crowd of 43,167 attended the game.

Following the season, Kansas State was invited to its first ever bowl game, the 1982 Independence Bowl against the Wisconsin Badgers.  The Badgers beat the Wildcats, 14–3.  The 1982 Independence Bowl was the first college football game televised live by ESPN.  After the season Dickey was named coach of the year by the Big Eight Conference.

Schedule

Roster

References

Kansas State
Kansas State Wildcats football seasons
Kansas State Wildcats football